Wollaston Congregational Church is a historic Congregational church building at 45-57 Lincoln Avenue in Wollaston, Massachusetts.  The granite Gothic Revival structure was designed by Smith & Walker, and built in 1926, on the site of an earlier (1875) wooden Gothic Revival church.  Its parish house, also Gothic in style and designed by the same team, was built in 1915.  The congregation was established as a consequence of the Wollaston area's rapid growth beginning in the 1870s.

The building was listed on the National Register of Historic Places in 2008.

See also
National Register of Historic Places listings in Quincy, Massachusetts

References

External links

Wollaston United Church of Christ

United Church of Christ churches in Massachusetts
Churches on the National Register of Historic Places in Massachusetts
Churches completed in 1926
20th-century United Church of Christ church buildings
Churches in Quincy, Massachusetts
Stone churches in Massachusetts
National Register of Historic Places in Quincy, Massachusetts